Chelora is a village in Kannur district  in the state of Kerala, India 8 km from Kannur town and on the Kannur-Mysore Highway. The Kannur International Airport is 15 km from Chelora.
Kadakkara Sri Dharmasastha Temple and Valannur Sri Risheishwara Temple are the two temples that attract people to the village. Chelora Govt Higher Secondary School is a local educational institution. Kappad, Valannur, Mathukoth, Peringalayi and Konganamkott Para are among the major localities in Chelora.

Administration
The administration of the town is done under kannur municipal corporation. corporation zonal office situated at mathukoth.

Accessibility
The Kannur Central Bus Terminal and Kannur Railway Station are situated at a distance of 10.3 km away from Chelora. Presently there is no railway lines passing through Chelora. But, easily available private buses makes Chelora accessible. Chelora can be reached by a bus to Iritty, Mattannur and Anjarakandy towns from Kannur. The bus-stop point of Chelora is commonly known as Mathukkoth. Chelora can be reached via Kappad also. (Kappad in Kannur district).

Landmarks
Chelora Govt. Higher Secondary School.
PHC Chelora, Mathukoth.
Kannur corporation zonal office, Mathukoth.
Kadakkara Sri Dharmasastha Kshetram
Valannur Rishieswara Kshetram
Chelora Jumamasjid
E K Nayanar center
A K G CLUB
A K G Memorial Vayanashala and Grandalayam
Sreerosh Green Acres
CK complex (shopping complex)
Mini industrial estate
Mandot Sree Mahavshnu Kshetram

Demographics
 India census, Chelora had a population of 36,500. Males constitute 48% of the population and females 52%. Chelora has an average literacy rate of 85%, higher than the national average of 59.5%; with male literacy of 87% and female literacy of 84%. 11% of the population is under 6 years of age.

 Number of residential buildings : 8000
 Number of Educational Institutions : 18
 Pre primary education centres : 35

References

Villages near Kannur airport